Anna Tyszkiewicz (1779–1867) was a Polish noblewoman and diarist.

Anna was the daughter of Ludwik Tyszkiewicz and Konstancja Poniatowska, and married Aleksander Stanisław Potocki on 15 May 1805 in Wilno, divorced him in 1821 and remarried Stanisław Dunin-Wąsowicz. Her diary was written between the years 1794 and 1820, and are regarded as an important historical source. It was published in 1897–98.

Works
 "Wspomnienia naocznego świadka" (1898)

References
 T. 6, cz. 1: Oświecenie. W: Bibliografia Literatury Polskiej – Nowy Korbut. Warszawa: Państwowy Instytut Wydawniczy, 1970, s. 58–60.

1779 births
1867 deaths
19th-century Polish women writers
a
Potocki family
Polish diarists
Women diarists
19th-century diarists